The Mad Fox, (also titled  Love, Thy Name Be Sorrow or Koiya koi nasuna koi) is a 1962 film directed by Tomu Uchida. It is based upon a 1734 bunraku play. It is noted for its use of bunraku and kabuki aesthetics, including joshikimaku (a type of curtain), masks, costumes and highly saturated colours, a break from Uchida's previous work.

Plot 
Sometime in the Heian period, the well renowned fortune teller Kamo no Yasunori is told by an oracle that he should adopt a girl who was born at a certain time. His two disciples, Abe no Yasuna and Absiya Doman, separately set out to find this girl. Yasunori finds identical twin girls born at the right time, daughters of the lord of Izumi and returns with the older one, Sakaki.

Ten years later strange omens appear. Upon consulting his oracle book, The Golden Crow, Yasunori reveals that the country is about to be thrown into turmoil with the crown prince, who lacks an heir, being cursed, but also something else he can tell only to his successor. Doman arrives late for this oracle reading saying he went first to the royal court to urge them to consult with his master. In front of the few people at the oracle reading Yasunori says this was disrespectful, that the Court would have called on him in proper order, and that he has changed his mind about naming Doman his successor. Yasunori starts towards the Court to tell of this oracle but he is killed on the road by a retainer in a plan arranged by his wife which is blamed on bandits.

Sakaki is enamoured of Yasuna and realises that in the absence of a formal document the Court will appoint Doman as successor, who is the more gracious speaker, is a Court insider, and is the choice of Yasunori's widow, so she intrigues against this by appearing at Court herself as heir of her adopted father. The Court declares that lots shall be cast to determine which of the two disciples will become successor and interpret The Golden Crow. However, when Sakaki opens the locked box which should contain the scroll the box is empty. Suspicion is cast all around and Doman has Yasuna locked up and he tortures Sakaki. In private, Yasunori's widow reveals that she copied Sakaki's key and stole the scroll so that Doman could be successor, and initiates an affair with him. Escaping, finding Sakaki dead, and overhearing the deceit, Yasuna goes mad and attacks the couple. Yasunori's widow dies in a fire and Yasuna escapes with the scroll.

Wandering madly in both his and Sakaki's clothes, Yasuna eventually ends up in Izumi where he sees Kuzunoha, Sakaki's identical twin sister, daughter of Lord Shoji. He is taken in by the lord's family who overlook his belief that Kuzunoha is Sakaki. Yasuna does not believe himself mad and wonders why Shoji has not yet permitted them to wed.

At court, Doman reveals that he saw a little more of the scroll: the Crown Prince's curse can be lifted by him siring an heir by copulating in a room adorned with the blood of a white vixen. One of the ministers reveals he knows of such a white vixen and a hunting party is sent to Izumi. The hunt takes places in a forest where Yasuna is walking with Kuzunoha and comes across an injured old woman. The hunting party finds them and ask if they have seen the white fox they have shot but Yasuna calls them idiots who can't tell the difference between a fox and a human as he has just pulled one of their arrows from an elderly lady.

Kuzunoha and Yasuna escort the lady to her hut where they are met by her husband. Inside the hut the old lady, her husband and their granddaughter, Kon, out of sight of the two humans who have departed, are revealed to be kitsune. Kon is ordered to look after Yasuna in gratitude for saving the lady's life. Yasuna and Kuzunoha are espied by Doman; the hunting party waylay the pair and Doman takes the scroll but Kon sees this. Travelling first as balls of flame, Kon's clan arrives, fight off the hunting party and make off with the scroll from Doman. Kon is ordered to shapechange and assume Kuzunoha's form while she tends to Yasuna's injuries (which she initially does by licking his wounds) after being warned not to do anything which might permanently isolate herself from her own kind.

Having fallen in love with him at first sight, Kon keeps Kuzunoha's form. With Yasuna still believing her to Sakaki they live in a small hut in a field and have a child together with Kon dreading the day she must return the scroll to him as on that day they must part. After some wandering men see Kon, Lord Shoji arrives with his wife and Kuzunoha who is lovesick for Yasuna. Shoji, Shoji's wife and Yasuna become confused at seeing two identical women (Kuzunoha and Kon shapechanged to Kuzunoha). Kon admits to being inhuman and says she will leave their child with Yasuna. She departs in the form of a white vixen and their hut disappears leaving Yasuna wondering if it was just a dream.

Upon picking up their child, he finds the Golden Crow scroll but the scene instantly changes to reprise that when Yasuna was alone and wandering madly after Sakaki's murder. He lies upon the ground in foetal position wearing Sakaki's kimono. The scene changes to a black rock, roughly the size of a human adult lying in foetal position, with a flame like the kitsune appeared as floating around it. A narrator admonishes the audience that love is empty, never fall in love.

Style 
The Mad Fox is considered a highly stylised and theatrical production. It was based upon a bunraku play that was later adapted as kabuki and Uchida has used elements from kabuki rather than using more typical cinematic techniques. Some kabuki techniques used are a curtain that appears to isolate the character only to have it drop and reveal he is not alone, and a headband that indicates his madness. Uchida freely mixes theatrical stage sets, including rotating stages and collapsible buildings, with location shooting.

Awards 
The film was nominated for the Golden Lion at the Venice Film Festival.

References 

1962 films
Japanese films based on plays
1960s Japanese films